Montbartier is a railway station in Montbartier, Occitanie, France. The station is located on the Bordeaux–Sète railway. The station is served by TER (local) services operated by SNCF.

Train services
The following services currently call at Montbartier:
local service (TER Occitanie) Brive-la-Gaillarde–Cahors–Montauban–Toulouse
local service (TER Occitanie) Montauban–Toulouse

References

Railway stations in Tarn-et-Garonne